Hussein El Gebaly	(Arabic:حسين الجبالي :ar:حسين الجبالي) (18 May 1934 – 18 January 2014 in Giza, Egypt) was an Egyptian artist.

Artist Biography 

He received his diploma from the Faculty of Fine Arts in Cairo in 1958, and his diploma of the Higher Institute for Artistic Education in 1959.
Studies in the Faculty of Education in Ain Shams University in 1964.
He optioned a scholarship from the Italian Government for three years from 1965 to 1968.
He optioned the diploma of specialization in lithography from the state Institute for Fine Arts and Book Drawing Urbino in Italy, 1967.

A scientific mission from the Netherlands Government to study Lithograph Arts and Printing with the Silk screen for nine months in 1976.
He received an invitation from the U.S. Government to spend a month to visit the ateliers, laboratories and special academies in graphic arts in 1980.

He worked as a professor in the Faculty of Fine Arts in Alexandria, Minya and Leonard Da Vinci Institute.
He supervised many artists in Helwan and Minya Universities. He participated in the Ph.D. and MA assertions in the above-mentioned universities as well as the Academy of Arts.

Professor and ex-president of Graphic Arts Department - Faculty of Fine Arts – in Cairo - University of Helwan.
Ex-president of Syndicate of Plastic Arts in Egypt.
President of the National Association of Contemporary Egyptian Graphic Arts with Egyptian and Foreign Artistes.

Prizes 

The Silver Medal from the Organization of Activating Tourism, Anacin in Italy - 1976.
Second Prize at Alexandria Biennial, Egypt - 1977.
The Prize of the Collection from Organization of Activating Tourism, Alexandria Egypt - 1978.
The State Prize for Encouraging Arts in 1979.
Medal of Arts & Sciences, First Grade, Egypt - 1979.
The Prize Collection for Biennial Lubjliana - 1987.
The Second Prize in Biennial of Graphic Arts on Wood Cut in Czechoslovakia – 1991.
The Golden Medal in the Trinali of Fredrick, Stad - 1989.
He optioned many Diplomas & Certificates of appreciation.
He was chosen to be a member in the international committee of Arbitration for the Biennial of Ukraine - 1991.
He optioned the Triennial Prize of Cairo - 1993 1.g medal.
He was chosen to be the guest of honor of the Third International Triennial for Graphic Art - 1999.
The State incentive prize (state merit award) for his services to the arts – Egypt - 2000.
Medal of Arts & Sciences, First Grade, Egypt - 2000 .

References
https://archive.today/20130125041814/http://www.hewarartgallery.com/Artists.asp?PageID=4&language=En&p=6&f=0&id=63
http://www.zamalekartgallery.com/en_exhibition.php?exhibitionID=12&artistID=9&availiable=
http://www.zamalekartgallery.com/en_ex_artist.php?artistID=9&exhibitionID=12&availiable= 
http://www.zamalekartgallery.com/en_ex_article.php?artistID=9&exhibitionID=12&availiable=
https://artfacts.net/artist/hussein-el-gebaly/207419
http://www.hopeandoptimism.com/HO73.htm
https://web.archive.org/web/20081012212112/http://weekly.ahram.org.eg/2000/488/cu2.htm
https://web.archive.org/web/20081017091144/http://www.miniprint.org/sp/minipr/particip.html
https://web.archive.org/web/20090216113836/http://myeyeonegypt.net/Briefs/ContemporaryArtInEgypt.html
http://www.eapgroup.com/articles/ear53_4seasonsart.pdf
https://web.archive.org/web/20090216113836/http://myeyeonegypt.net/Briefs/ContemporaryArtInEgypt.html
http://www.bibliopolis.com/main/books/zenbooks_zb00347.html?id=UrWUXbDa
http://www.velaj.com/?cid=1,85,188
http://abstractart2006.narod.ru/pictures/Gebali/page.htm
http://www.ecampus.com/book/9789774248597
http://www.fineart.gov.eg/arb/cv/CV.asp?IDS=781
http://www.asharqalawsat.com/details.asp?section=30&article=304865&issueno=9692
http://www.elbadeel.net/index.php?option=com_content&task=view&id=16199&Itemid=39
http://www.arabdecision.org/show_cv_5_14_22_1_3_577722969.htm
https://web.archive.org/web/20090130021311/http://www.newstin.ae/tag/ar/76368274
https://web.archive.org/web/20090401030629/http://www.mmukhtarmuseum.gov.eg/main.html
http://www.aawsat.com/details.asp?section=54&article=492894&issueno=10930
http://wiki.yahala.co.il/index.php?title=%D8%AD%D8%B3%D9%8A%D9%86_%D8%A7%D9%84%D8%AC%D8%A8%D8%A7%D9%84%D9%8A
http://www.gom.com.eg/algomhuria/2005/06/11/hadeeth/detail07.shtml
http://www.diwanalarab.com/spip.php?article7900

1934 births
2014 deaths
Egyptian artists
Ain Shams University alumni
Academic staff of Helwan University